Mitchell Depot Historical Museum is located in Mitchell, Georgia, Glascock County, Georgia in the United States. The former railroad depot is now a museum located along Georgia Highway 102 in downtown Mitchell. It was a station on the Augusta Southern Railroad.

See also
National Register of Historic Places listings in Glascock County, Georgia

References

External links
 Mitchell Depot Museum - Explore Georgia

Former railway stations in Georgia (U.S. state)
Museums in Glascock County, Georgia
History museums in Georgia (U.S. state)
Railway stations in Georgia (U.S. state)